The Ford Wayne Gretzky Classic presented by Samsung was a golf tournament on the Nationwide Tour from 2008 to 2010. It was played at the Georgian Bay Club in Clarksburg and the Raven Golf Club at Lora Bay in Thornbury, Ontario, Canada.

The 2010 purse was $800,099, with $144,018 going to the winner. The extra $99 is an homage to Wayne Gretzky, the tournament host and Hall of Fame hockey player who wore the number 99 during his career.

Winners

Bolded golfers graduated to the PGA Tour via the final Nationwide Tour money list.

External links

Coverage on PGA Tour's official site

Former Korn Ferry Tour events
Golf tournaments in Ontario
Wayne Gretzky
Recurring sporting events established in 2008
Recurring sporting events disestablished in 2010